

A–M 

To find entries for A–M, use the table of contents above.

N 

 N.A.Br. – Nellie Adalesa Brown (1876–1956)
 Naczi – Robert Francis Cox Naczi (born 1963)
 Nadeaud – Jean Nadeaud (1834–1898)
 Nadson – Georgii Adamovich Nadson (1867–1939)
 Nagam. – Hidetoshi Nagamasu (fl. 1986)
 Nägeli – Carl Nägeli (1817–1891)
 Naive – Mark Arcebal K. Naive (fl. 2016)
 Nakai – Takenoshin Nakai (1882–1952)
 Napper – Diana Margaret Napper (1930–1972)
 Nash – George Valentine Nash (1864–1921)
 Nast – Charlotte Georgia Nast (1905–1991)
 Nasution – Rusdy E. Nasution (fl. 1977)
 Nath. – Alfred Gabriel Nathorst (1850–1921)
 Naudin – Charles Victor Naudin (1815–1899)
 Navashin – Sergei Gavrilovich Navashin (1857–1930)
 Náves – Andrés Náves (1839–1910)
 N.A.Wakef. – Norman Arthur Wakefield (1918–1972)
 N.Balach. – Natesan Balachandran (born 1965)
 N.Busch – Nicolaĭ Adolfowitsch Busch (1869–1941)
 N.B.Ward – Nathaniel Bagshaw Ward (1791–1868)
 N.Cardoso – Nelsa Cardoso (born 1970) 
 N.C.Hend. – Norlan C. Henderson (born 1915)
 N.C.Melvin – Norman C. Melvin (fl. 1977)
 N.C.W.Beadle – Noel Charles William Beadle (1914–1998)
 N.D.Atwood – Nephi Duane Atwood (born 1938) 
 N.E.Br. – Nicholas Edward Brown (1849–1934)
 Neck. – Noel Martin Joseph de Necker (1730–1793)
 Née – Luis Née (1734–1807)
 Nees – Christian Gottfried Daniel Nees von Esenbeck (1776–1858)
 Neger – Franz Wilhelm Neger (1868–1923)
 N.E.Gray – Netta Elizabeth Gray (1913–1970)
 N.E.Hansen – Niels Ebbesen Hansen (1866–1950)
 Nehrl. – Henry Nehrling (1853–1929)
 Neill – Patrick Neill (1776–1851)
 Neilr. – August Neilreich (1803–1871)
 Nel – Gert Cornelius Nel (1885–1950)
 Nelmes – Ernest Nelmes (1895–1959)
 Nelson – David Nelson (c.1740–1789)
 Nemoto – Kwanji Nemoto (1860–1936)
 Nerz – Joachim Nerz (fl. 1994)
 Ness – Helge Ness (1861–1928)
 Nestl. – Chrétien Géofroy Nestler (1778–1832)
 Neubert – Wilhelm Neubert (1808–1905)
 Neumann – Joseph Henri Francois Neumann (1800–1858)
 Neveu-Lem. – Maurice Neveu-Lemaire (1872–1951)
 Nevski – Sergei Arsenjevic Nevski (1908–1938)
 Newb. – John Strong Newberry (1822–1892)
 Newc. – Frederick Charles Newcombe (1858–1927)
 Newman – Edward Newman (1801–1876)
 Newton – Isaac Newton (1840–1906)
 N.F.Hend. – Nellie Frater Henderson (1885–1952)
 N.F.Mattos – Nilza Fischer de Mattos (born 1931)
 N.F.Robertson – Noel Farnie Robertson (1923–1999)
 Ng – Francis S.P. Ng (born 1940)
 Ngamr. – Chatchai Ngamriabsakul (fl. 2000)
 N.Garcia – Núria Garcia Jacas (born 1961), also "Núria Garcia-Jacas"
 N.Gibson – Neil Gibson (born 1957)
 N.G.Marchant – Neville Graeme Marchant (born 1939)
 N.G.Mill. – Norton George Miller (1942–2011)
 N.G.Walsh – Neville Grant Walsh (born 1956)
 N.Hallé – Nicolas Hallé (born 1927)
 N.H.F.Desp. – Narcisse Henri François Desportes (1776–1856)
 N.H.Holmgren – Noel Herman Holmgren (born 1937)
 Nicholls – William Henry Nicholls (1885–1951)
 Nichols – George Elwood Nichols (1882–1939)
 Nickrent – Daniel L. Nickrent (born 1956)
 Nicolai – Ernst August Nicolai (1800–1874)
 Nicolson – Dan Henry Nicolson (1933–2016)
 Nicora – Elisa G. Nicora (1912–2001)
 Nied. – Franz Josef Niedenzu (1857–1937)
 Nielsen – Peter Nielsen (1829–1897)
 Nieuwenh. – A.W. Nieuwenhuis (fl. 1908)
 Nieuwl. – Julius Aloysius Arthur Nieuwland (1878–1936)
 Nikitin – Sergei Nikolaevic Nikitin (1850–1909)
 Nikitina – Ennafa Vasilievna Nikitina (1893–1976)
 Nir – Mark Anthony Nir (born 1935) 
 Nitschke – Theodor Rudolph Joseph Nitschke (1834–1883)
 N.Jacobsen – Niels Henning Günther Jacobsen (born 1941)
 N.Jardine – Nick Jardine (born 1943)
 N.J.Chung – Nian June Chung (fl. 1977)
 N.Kilian – Norbert Kilian (born 1957)
 N.L.Alcock – Nora Lilian Alcock (c.1875–1972)
 N.Lund – Nils (Nicolai) Lund (1814–1847)
 N.Mukh. – Nirmalendu Mukherjee (fl. 1967–75)
 N.N.Tran – Ngoc Ninh Tran (born 1943)
 Nob.Tanaka – Nobuyuki Tanaka (fl. 2000)
 Noë – Friedrich Wilhelm Noë (1798–1858)
 Noegg. – Johann Jakob Nöggerath (Jacob Noeggerath) (1788–1877)
 Noerdl. (also Nördl.) – Hermann Noerdlinger (1818–1897)
 Noltie – Henry John Noltie (born 1957)
 Noot. – Hans Peter Nooteboom (1934–2022)
 Nordal (also I.Bjørnstadt) – Inger Nordal (born 1944)
 Nordensk. – Nils Adolph Erik (von) Nordenskiöld (1832–1901)
 Nördl. (also Noerdl.) – Herman von Nördlinger (1818–1897)
 Nordm. – Alexander von Nordmann (1803–1866)
 Norl. – Nils Tycho Norlindh (born 1906)
 Noronha – Francisco Noronha (1748–1788)
 Northr. – Alice Belle (Rich) Northrop (1864–1922)
 Norton – John Bitting Smith Norton (1872–1966)
 Nothdurft – Heinrich Wilhelm Christian Nothdurft (born 1921)
 Nowicke – Joan W. Nowicke (born 1938)
 Novopokr. – Ivan Vassiljevich Novopokrovsky (1880–1951)
 N.P.Balakr. – Nambiyath Puthansurayil Balakrishnan (born 1935)
 N.P.Barker – Nigel P. Barker (fl. 1993)
 N.Pfeiff. – Norma Etta Pfeiffer (born 1889)
 N.P.Pratov – N. P. Pratov (born 1934)
 N.P.Taylor – Nigel Paul Taylor (born 1956)
 N.Ramesh – N. Ramesh (fl. 2000)
 N.Robson – Norman Keith Bonner Robson (born 1928)
 N.Rosén (also Rosenstein) – Nils Rosén von Rosenstein (1706–1773)
 N.Roux – Nisius Roux (1854–1923)
 N.Ruiz-R. – Natalia Ruiz-Rodgers (fl. 1995–7)
 N.S.Fraga – Naomi Fraga (born 1979) 
 N.S.Golubk. – Nina Golubkova (1932–2009) 
 N.S.Pavlova. – N. S. Pavlova (born 1938)
 N.Streiber – Nikola Streiber (fl. 1999)
 N.Taylor – Norman Taylor (1883–1967)
 N.T.Burb. – Nancy Tyson Burbidge (1912–1977)
 N.Terracc. – Nicola Terracciano (1837–1921)
 N.T.Sauss. – Nicolas-Théodore de Saussure (1767–1845)
 Nubl. – Erwin Nubling (1876–1953)
 Nusb. – Louis Paul Gustave Alvin Nusbaumer (born 1977)
 Nutt. – Thomas Nuttall (1786–1859)
 N.W.Simmonds – Norman Willison Simmonds (born 1922)
 N.W.Uhl – Natalie Whitford Uhl (1919–2017)
 Nyár. – Erasmus Julius Nyárády (1881–1966)
 Nyffeler – Reto Nyffeler (fl. 1992)
 Nygaard – Gunnar Nygaard (1903–2002)
 Nyholm – Elsa Cecilia Nyholm (1911–2002)
 Nyl. – (Wilhelm) William Nylander (1822–1899)
 Nyman – Carl Frederik Nyman (1820–1893)

O 

 Oakes – William Oakes (1799–1848)
 O.B.Davies – Olive Blanche Davies (1884–1976)
 O.Berg – Otto Karl Berg (1815–1866)
 Oberm. – Anna Amelia Obermeyer (1907–2001)
 Oberpr. – Christoph Oberprieler (born 1964)
 O.Bolòs – Oriol de Bolòs (1924–2007)
 Obón –  (born 1959)
 O'Brien – James O'Brien (1842–1930)
 Ochoa – Carlos M. Ochoa (fl. 1952)
 Ochse – Jacob Jonas Ochse (1891–1970)
 Ochyra – Ryszard Ochyra (born 1949)
 O.Cohen – Ofer Cohen (fl. 1995)
 O.C.Schmidt – Otto Christian Schmidt (1900–1951)
 O.Danesch – Othmar Danesch (born 1919)
 O.Deg. – Otto Degener (1899–1988)
 O'Donell – Carlos Alberto O'Donell (1912–1954)
 O.D.Evans – Obed David Evans (1889–1975)
 Odyuo – Nripemo Odyüo (born 1970)
 Oeder – Georg Christian Oeder (1728–1791)
 O.E.Erikss. – Ove Erik Eriksson (1935-)
 Oerst. – Anders Sandøe Ørsted (1816–1872)
 O.E.Schulz – Otto Eugen Schulz (1874–1936)
 O.F.Cook – Orator F. Cook (1867–1949)
 O.Fedtsch. – Olga Alexandrowna Fedtschenko (1845–1921)
 O.F.Müll. – Otto Friedrich Müller (1730–1784)
 O.Gruss – Olaf Gruss (born 1948)
 O.Hoffm. – Karl August Otto Hoffmann (1853–1909)
 Ohi-Toma – Tetsuo Ohi-Toma (fl. 2010)
 O.H.Sarg. – Oswald Hewlett Sargent (1880–1952)
 Ohtani – Shigeru Ohtani (fl. 1961)
 O.Huber – Otto Huber (born 1944)
 Ohwi – Jisaburo Ohwi (1905–1977)
 O.J.Rich. – Olivier Jules Richard (1836–1896)
 Okamura – Kintaro Okamura (1867–1935)
 Oken – Lorenz Oken (1779–1851)
 O.K.Mill. – Orson Knapp Miller, Jr. (1930–2006)
 Olde – Peter M. Olde (born 1945)
 Oldenl. – Henrik Bernard Oldenland (c. 1663–1699)
 Oldfield – Augustus Frederick Oldfield (1820–1887)
 Oldham – Thomas Oldham (1816–1878)
 Oliv. – Daniel Oliver (1830–1916)
 Olmstead – Richard Glenn Olmstead (born 1951)
 Olney – Stephen Thayer Olney (1812–1878)
 Oltm. – Friedrich Oltmanns (1860–1945)
 Omino – Elizabeth Omino (born 1962)
 Ö.Nilsson – Örjan Eric Gustaf Nilsson (born 1933)
 Onions – Agnes H. S. Onions (fl. 1966)
 Onno – Max Onno (born 1903)
 Ooststr. – Simon Jan van Ooststroom (1906–1982)
 Opiz – Philipp Maximilian Opiz (1787–1858)
 Oppenh. – Heinz Reinhard Oppenheimer (1899–1971)
 Orange – Alan Orange (born 1955)
 Orb. – Charles Henry Dessalines d'Orbigny (1806–1876)
 Orbán – Sándor Orbán (1947–2005)
 Orchard – Anthony Edward Orchard (born 1946)
 Orcutt – Charles Russell Orcutt (1864–1929)
 Orme – Andrew E. Orme (fl. 2017)
 Ormerod – Paul Abel Ormerod (born 1969)
 Ormonde – José Eduardo Martins Ormonde (1943–2004)
 Ornduff – Robert Ornduff (1932–2000)
 O.Rosenb. – Gustaf Otto Rosenberg (1872–1948)
 Orph. – Theodoros G. Orphanides (1817–1886)
 Orr – Matthew Young Orr (1883–1953)
 Ortega – Casimiro Gómez Ortega (1740–1818)
 Ortgies – Karl Eduard Ortgies (1829–1916)
 Orthia – L. A. Orthia (fl. 2005)
 Ortmann – Anton Ortmann (1801–1861)
 Osbeck – Pehr Osbeck (1723–1805)
 Osborn – Arthur Osborn (1878–1964)
 O.Schneid. – Oskar Schneider (1841–1903)
 O.Schwarz – Otto Karl Anton Schwarz (1900–1983)
 Oshio – Masayoshi Oshio (born 1937)
 Oshite – Kei Oshite (born 1919)
 Osipian – Lia Levonevna Osipian (born 1930)
 Ósk. – Ingimar Óskarsson (1892–1981)
 Osner – George Adin Osner (born 1888)
 Osorio – Héctor Saúl Osorio Rial (1928–2016)
 Ospina – Hernandez Mariano Ospina (born 1934)
 Ossa – José Antonio de la Ossa (died 1829)
 Osswald – Louis Osswald (1854–1918)
 Ossyczn. – V. V. Ossycznjuk (born 1918)
 Ostapko – V. M. Ostapko (born 1950)
 Osten – Cornelius Osten (1863–1936)
 Ostenf. – Carl Hansen Ostenfeld (1873–1931)
 Osterh. – George Everett Osterhout (1858–1937)
 Osterm. – Franz Ostermeyer (died 1921)
 Osterw. – Adolf Osterwalder (1872–1948)
 Osterwald – Karl Osterwald (1853–1923)
 Östman – Magnus Östman (1852–1927)
 Østrup – Ernst Vilhelm Østrup (1845–1917)
 Osvač. – Vera Osvačilová (born 1924)
 Oterdoom – Herman John Oterdoom (fl. 1994)
 Otth – Carl Adolf Otth (1803–1839)
 Otto – Christoph Friedrich Otto (1783–1856)
 Ottol. – Kornelius Johannes Willem Ottolander (1822–1887)
 Oudejans – Robertus Cornelis Hilarius Maria Oudejans (born 1943)
 Oudem. – Cornelius Anton Jan Abraham Oudemans (1825–1906)
 Oudney – Walter Oudney (1790–1824)
 Ovcz. – Pavel Nikolaevich Ovczinnikov (1903–1979)
 Overeem – Casper van Overeem (de Haas) (1893–1927)
 Owen – Maria Louisa Owen (1825–1913)
 Ownbey – Francis Marion Ownbey (1910–1974)
 O.Yano – Olga Yano (born 1946)
 O.Zacharias – Emil Otto Zacharias (1846–1916)

P–Z 

To find entries for P–Z, use the table of contents above.

 

1